is a passenger railway station located in the city of Hachiōji, Tokyo, Japan, operated by the private railway operator Keio Corporation.

Lines 

Station layout 
This station consists of two ground-level opposed side platforms serving two tracks.

Platforms

History
It was renamed to its present name on October 1, 1967.

Passenger statistics
In fiscal 2019, the station was used by an average of 5,054 passengers daily. 

The passenger figures (boarding passengers only) for previous years are as shown below.

Surrounding area
 Japan National Route 16
 Hachioji City Hall Yui Office
 Hachioji City Yui Junior High School
 Hachioji Katakura Post Office

See also
 List of railway stations in Japan

References

External links

Keio Railway Station Information 

}

Keio Takao Line
Stations of Keio Corporation
Railway stations in Tokyo
Railway stations in Japan opened in 1931
Hachiōji, Tokyo